Zhuanglang County is a rural county under the administration of the prefecture-level city of Pingliang in the east of Gansu Province, China. It borders Ningxia to the north, the Gansu county-level divisions of Huating City to the east, Zhangjiachuan County to the southeast, Qin'an County to the southwest, and Jingning County to the west. Nearby major cities include Pingliang, Tianshui, Guyuan, and Lanzhou.

The county seat of Zhuanglang—once known as Zhuanglang, Tchouang-lan, Chwang-lan, or Chwanglang—is now called Shuiluo. Its walled town was an important regional post in late imperial China, visited by Jesuit missionaries and reported on by the Macartney Embassy. It remains a relatively busy administrative, educational, and trading spot for the county. Other market towns in the county include Nanhu, Zhudian, and Handian in the north, south-west, and south-east respectively.

The people of Zhuanglang are predominantly farmers, producing wheat and potatoes on terraced hills. The farmers of Zhuanglang were proclaimed in the 1980s for having terraced all available hillside, and a monument in the county town records the famous 'Zhuanglang Spirit' by which this was achieved.

In recent years, education has been a priority for the local government. With the help of World Bank funding, schools in Zhuanglang have been well supported. Nearly all children now complete primary education, while there are 23 junior middle schools, and 3 senior middle schools which send students on to colleges and universities.

The cultural sites of Zhuanglang include: 
Yunyasi.
Zi Jin Temple. This temple was re-opened in 1986 after the Cultural Revolution and is in the centre of the county town. Close by is an earth fortress dating from the era of Mongol invasions through this region.
Chen Dong Temple. This more isolated Taoist temple is to be found in the north-east of the county.

The highest point of the county is Taomushan at 2857m above sea level.

Population (2005 est.)
Total = 420,000
Ethnic composition = 99% Han Chinese, 1% Hui Muslim
Major Towns
Shuiluo = 30,000
Nanhu = 10,000
Zhudian = 6,000
Handian = 5,000

Administrative Divisions
Zhuanglang County is divided to 1 Subdistricts, 15 towns and 3 townships.
Subdistricts
 Shuiluo

Towns

-Towns are upgraded from Township.

Townships
 Yanghe Township 
 Zhaodun Township
 Zhenghe  Township

Climate

References

External links
 Official website of Zhuanglang County government

 
County-level divisions of Gansu
Pingliang